Anacithara nanisca is a species of sea snail, a marine gastropod mollusk in the family Horaiclavidae.

R.N. Kilburn disputed in 1994 that Mangilia nanisca should belong to the genus Anacithara, as it shows apertural features that are unknown in Anacithara, such as two median denticles in the inner lip and a posterior nodule on the outer lip.

Description

Distribution
This marine species occurs off Queensland, Australia and off the Loyalty Islands

References

 Hervier, J. 1897. Descriptions d'espèces nouvelles de Mollusques provenant de l'Archipel de la Nouvelle Calédonie. Journal de Conchyliologie 45: 47–69, pls 2-3
 Bouge & Dautzenberg, Journal de Conchyliologie., Ixi., 1913 (1914), p. 153.

External links
  Hedley, C. 1922. A revision of the Australian Turridae. Records of the Australian Museum 13(6): 213-359, pls 42-56
  Tucker, J.K. 2004 Catalog of recent and fossil turrids (Mollusca: Gastropoda). Zootaxa 682:1-1295
 MNHN, Patis: syntype

nanisca
Gastropods described in 1897